The narrowfin smooth-hound or Florida smooth-hound (Mustelus norrisi) is a houndshark of the family Triakidae. It is found on the continental shelves of the subtropical western Atlantic, from Florida and the northern Gulf of Mexico to Venezuela, and also southern Brazil, between latitudes 32° N and 36° S, from the surface to a depth of 100 m. It can grow up to a length of 1.1 m.

References

narrowfin smooth-hound
Gulf of Mexico
Fish of the Atlantic Ocean
Fish of Colombia
Fish of the Dominican Republic
Fish of Venezuela
Fish of Uruguay
narrowfin smooth-hound